The Foreign Affairs Manual (FAM) is published by the United States Department of State and can be accessed on the department's website. It contains the functional statements, organizational responsibilities, and authorities of each of the major components of the department. Together, the manual comprise the basic organizational directive of the department.

References

External links 

 

Legal literature
United States Department of State
United States Department of State publications